David Muller is a named Professor in the School of Applied and Engineering Physics at Cornell University and co-director of the Kavli Institute at Cornell for Nanoscale Science. He is known for his work in electron microscopy, condensed matter physics, and discovery of atomic structure across a wide range of materials including applications in clean energy research, semiconductor devices, and 2D materials. He is a fellow in the American Physical Society and the Microscopy Society of America and received the MSA Burton Medal, the MAS Duncumb Award, and the Ernst Ruska Prize of the German Society for Electron Microscopy. He is twice in the Guinness World Records, most recently, for achieving the highest resolution microscope image ever recorded using electron ptychography. His work spans theory, computation, and experimental physics research. He is also a Faculty member of the Center for Bright Beams.

Selected publications

References

External links 

Cornell University faculty
Fellows of the American Physical Society
Cornell University College of Engineering alumni
Year of birth missing (living people)
21st-century South African physicists
Australian physicists
Living people